The Sappa Formation is a fossil bearing geologic formation in Nebraska.

See also

 List of fossiliferous stratigraphic units in Nebraska
 Paleontology in Nebraska

References
 

Paleogene geology of Nebraska
Cretaceous System of North America